"Mystic Rhythms" is a song by the Canadian rock band Rush. It was released as the second single from their 1985 album Power Windows. The single charted at number 21 on the US Mainstream Rock chart. The song was featured on several compilation albums and was performed live by the band on their Power Windows, Counterparts and R30 tours, appearing on the live album A Show of Hands and the live DVD R30: 30th Anniversary World Tour. For this song, drummer Neil Peart utilized his electronic drum kit, playing it on the album and in concert during live performances of the track.

The song was used as the opening song of the NBC news program 1986.

The music video was directed by Gerald Casale, who is a member of Devo.

Charts

See also
List of Rush songs

References

1985 songs
1986 singles
1980s ballads
Rush (band) songs
Rock ballads
Song recordings produced by Peter Collins (record producer)
Songs written by Neil Peart
Songs written by Alex Lifeson
Songs written by Geddy Lee
Mercury Records singles